William A. Stickel (1893–1944) was a bridge engineer for the Essex County, New Jersey, and the New Jersey State Highway Department (now New Jersey Department of Transportation) who was associated with the construction of numerous bridges throughout the state built in the early part of the 20th century. The William A. Stickel Memorial Bridge is named in his honor.

See also

 Morris Goodkind
 Gilmore David Clarke
 List of crossings of the Hackensack River
 List of crossings of the Lower Passaic River
 List of crossings of the Upper Passaic River
 List of crossings of the Raritan River
 List of bridges, tunnels, and cuts in Hudson County, New Jersey
 List of bridges documented by the Historic American Engineering Record in New Jersey
 List of bridges on the National Register of Historic Places in New Jersey

References 

1893 births
1944 deaths
Engineers from New Jersey
American bridge engineers
People from Newark, New Jersey
People from East Orange, New Jersey
Lehigh University alumni
20th-century American engineers